Roman Sanzhar  (born 28 May 1979) is a former Ukrainian professional football midfielder and current Ukrainian coach.

Career
In December 2012, Sanzhar announced his retirement and became the assistant coach for the Ukrainian First League club FC Olimpik Donetsk. In 17 April 2013 he was appointed as interim coach to the same club after working during the short time as assistant coach in this club. He helped the club win the 2013–14 Ukrainian First League and win promotion to the Ukrainian Premier League.

References

External links
 

1979 births
Living people
Ukrainian footballers
FC Shakhtar-3 Donetsk players
FC Metalurh Donetsk players
FC Metalurh-2 Donetsk players
FC Kryvbas Kryvyi Rih players
FC Zorya Luhansk players
FC Olimpik Donetsk players
FC Mashynobudivnyk Druzhkivka players
Ukrainian Premier League players
Association football midfielders
Ukrainian football managers
Footballers from Donetsk
FC Olimpik Donetsk managers
FC Karpaty Lviv managers
Ukrainian Premier League managers